Highland Secondary School or Highlands Secondary School may refer to:

École Highland Secondary School, Comox, British Columbia, Canada
Highland Secondary School (Dundas), Ontario, Canada
Grey Highlands Secondary School, Flesherton, Ontario, Canada
Haliburton Highlands Secondary School, Haliburton, Ontario, Canada
Almaguin Highlands Secondary School, South River, Ontario, Canada
Highland ISD Secondary School, Roscoe, Texas
Highlands Secondary School, Enfield, Middlesex, United Kingdom

See also
Highland High School (disambiguation)